Edwin George Booz (September 2, 1887 - October 1, 1951) was an American management consultant, businessman and corporate executive. He co-founded the consulting firm, Booz Allen Hamilton.

Biography

Early life and career 
Booz was born in 1887 in Reading, Pennsylvania, to Thomas H. Booz and Sarah (Spencer) Booz. At the Kellogg School at Northwestern University he obtained his bachelor's degree in economics in 1912, and his master's degree in psychology in 1914. Two years after his graduation Booz founded the Business Research Service in 1914. His business was briefly put on hold while he served in the Army from 1917-1919. The business he founded would eventually become known as Booz Allen Hamilton.

Retirement and death 
Booz retired partially from the firm in 1946 and died of a stroke in October 1951.

References

External links 
 Edwin G. Booz - Booz Allen Hamilton
 Edwin Abl

1887 births
1951 deaths
20th-century American businesspeople
American consultants
Booz Allen Hamilton people
Kellogg School of Management alumni
Northwestern University alumni
20th-century American male writers
People from Reading, Pennsylvania